Francis Higbee Case (December 9, 1896June 22, 1962) was an American journalist and politician who served for 25 years as a member of the United States Congress from South Dakota. He was a Republican.

Biography
Case was born in Everly, Iowa, the son of Mary Ellen (née Grannis) and the Reverend Herbert Llywellen Case. He moved with his parents to Sturgis, South Dakota at the age of 13. After graduating from the public schools he attended Dakota Wesleyan University and Northwestern University graduating in 1920. During World War I he served in the United States Marine Corps, and subsequently he served in United States Army Reserve and the Marine Corps Reserve.

Immediately after finishing college he began a 15-year career as a newspaper editor. Until 1922 he was the assistant editor of the Epworth Herald in Chicago. From 1922 to 1925 he was the telegraph writer and editorial writer for the Daily Journal in Rapid City, South Dakota. From 1925 to 1931 he was the editor and publisher of the Hot Springs Star in Hot Springs, South Dakota. Finally from 1931 until he entered Congress he was the editor and publisher of the Custer Chronicle in Custer, South Dakota.

U.S. House of Representatives (1937–1951)
Case entered politics in 1934 when he ran for a seat in the United States House of Representatives but lost. In 1936, however, he was elected to the U.S. House and served in it for seven terms. Before the United States entered World War II he was a moderate supporter of isolationism. In 1947–8, he served on the Herter Committee.   Case left the House in 1951 when he became a senator.

U.S. Senate (1951–1962)
Case decided to run for the Senate in the 1950 election, and defeated the incumbent John Chandler Gurney in the Republican primary. In the general election he easily defeated Democrat John A. Engel receiving 63% of the vote. In his first term in the Senate he served as chairman of the United States Senate Committee on the District of Columbia from 1953 to 1955, and was a supporter of greater self-rule in the district. In 1954 he served on a committee to investigate censuring Senator Joseph McCarthy. Case was reelected to the Senate in 1956, in a very close race against Democrat Kenneth Holum receiving 50.8% of the vote.

Case was known as a moderate Senator whose main goals were to expand America's road and waterway infrastructure, particularly in South Dakota. Lake Francis Case, along the Missouri River, is named after him, as is a bridge on I-395 in Washington, D.C. Case voted in favor of the Civil Rights Acts of 1957 and 1960, but did not vote on the 24th Amendment to the U.S. Constitution.

Case served in the Senate from 1951 until his death. He died of a heart attack at the Naval Hospital in Bethesda, Maryland, on June 22, 1962. His death occurred several months before the expiration of his second term in the Senate. he was buried at Black Hills National Cemetery in Sturgis.

Honors
 South Dakota Highway 44 over the Missouri River in South Dakota has been dedicated as the Francis Case Memorial Bridge, crossing the Lake Francis Case

See also

 List of United States Congress members who died in office (1950–99)
 List of members of the House Un-American Activities Committee

References

 Retrieved on 2009-02-16

External links

Francis Higbee Case at Political Graveyard

1896 births
1962 deaths
United States Marine Corps personnel of World War I
American newspaper editors
Dakota Wesleyan University alumni
Northwestern University alumni
Politicians from Rapid City, South Dakota
United States Marines
United States Marine Corps reservists
Republican Party United States senators from South Dakota
People from Custer, South Dakota
Republican Party members of the United States House of Representatives from South Dakota
Burials in South Dakota
Journalists from South Dakota
20th-century American politicians
Military personnel from Iowa
People from Clay County, Iowa
People from Sturgis, South Dakota
20th-century American journalists
American male journalists